Year 1292 (MCCXCII) was a leap year starting on Tuesday (link will display the full calendar) of the Julian calendar.

Events

By place

Europe 
 June 24 – Castilian forces led by King Sancho IV (the Brave) begin the siege of Tarifa, eleven newly built engines bombard the city constantly by land and sea. Meanwhile, Muhammad II, Nasrid ruler of Granada, provides the army of Sancho with men, arms and also aid the blockade in the Strait of Gibraltar. Muhammad attacks Marinid outposts, and his forces seize Estepona on the coast to the west of Málaga. Sancho conquers Tarifa after a siege of four months, on October 13.
 December – Muhammad II sends ambassadors to the Castilian court to ask Sancho IV (the Brave) to surrender Tarifa. Sancho refuses to yield the city to Granada and Muhammad, feeling betrayed, switches sides to form an alliance with the Marinids.

England 
 November 17 – John Balliol is selected by King Edward I (Longshanks) as ruler of Scotland at Berwick, from among 13 competitors for the Crown of Scotland. Edward then treats John as a puppet ruler and Scotland as a vassal state, provoking the Wars of Scottish Independence, commencing in 1296. John is crowned at Scone, on November 30, on St. Andrew's Day. Scotland's castles are returned to the powerful magnates.
 December – John Balliol is summoned by Edward I (Longshanks) to Westminster to answer an appeal by Macduff of Fife against a judgment imposed on him by the Scottish Parliament. John refuses to answer MacDuff's appeal, 'without consulting the people of his realm'. Edward asks for compensation for the violation of English law and demands to hand him over three Scottish castles as repayment for the crime committed.

Levant 
 Mamluk forces under Sultan Al-Ashraf Khalil accompanied by his vizier Ibn al-Sal'us arrive in Damascus. Khalil travels via Aleppo to besiege the castle of Qal'at ar-Rum ("Castle of the Romans"), which is the official seat of Stephen IV, patriarch of Armenia. The Mamluks besiege the castle with more than 30 catapults and capture it after 30 days.
 Al-Ashraf Khalil returns to Damascus and assembles an army to attack Sis, the capital of the Armenian Kingdom of Cilicia.  An Armenian embassy arrives in Damascus, and reaches a settlement with Khalil. The cities of Til Hemdun, Marash and Behesni are given to the Mamluks in order to maintain peace.
 November – Michael II becomes Syriac Orthodox patriarch of Antioch (until 1312).

Asia 
 Kublai Khan sends a Mongol expeditionary force (some 20,000 men) to Java. He collects an invasion fleet with some 500–1,000 ships and enough provisions for a year from Fujian, Jiangxi and Huguang in southern China. The fleet travels past Champa (modern Vietnam) and the Karimata Islands. The Mongols land on Java, taking the capital of Kediri, but it proves impossible to hold.
 King Mangrai (the Great) of Ngoenyang conquers and annexes the Mon kingdom of Hariphunchai, creating a political union in the form of the Lanna Kingdom.
 The Vaghela Dynasty in Gujarat (located along the western coast of India) is subjugated by the Deccan Yadava Dynasty of Daulatabad.

By topic

Religion 
 Spring – The Taxatio Ecclesiastica, compiled in 1291–1292, is completed under the order of Pope Nicholas IV. The Taxatio is a detailed database valuation for ecclesiastical taxation of English, Welsh and Irish churches.
 April 4 – Nicholas IV dies after a 4-year pontificate in Rome. The cardinals assemble at Perugia to elect a new pope (1292–1294 papal election). 
</onlyinclude>

Births 
 January 20 – Elizabeth of Bohemia, queen of Bohemia (d. 1330)
 January 29 – Ibn Qayyim al-Jawziyya, Syrian polymath (d. 1350)
 May 28 – Philip of Castile, Spanish nobleman and prince (d. 1327)
 June 24 – Otto the Mild, German nobleman and knight (d. 1344)
 October 3 – Eleanor de Clare, English noblewoman (d. 1337)
 Chu Văn An, Vietnamese physician and mandarin (d. 1370)
 Dolpopa Sherab Gyaltsen, Tibetan religious leader (d. 1361)
 Elisenda of Montcada, queen and regent of Aragon (d. 1364)
 Evrard d'Orleans, French Gothic sculptor and painter (d. 1357)
 Gerhard III (the Great), German nobleman and prince (d. 1340)
 Henry IV (the Faithful), Polish nobleman and knight (d. 1342)
 Henry Burghersh, English bishop and statesman (d. 1340)
 John VI (Kantakouzenos), Byzantine emperor (d. 1383)
 John Grandisson, English chaplain and bishop (d. 1369)
 John Marmion, Norman nobleman and knight (d. 1335)
 Richard of Wallingford, English mathematician (d. 1336)
 Robert de Stratford, English bishop and chancellor (d. 1362)
 Saionji Neishi (or Yasuko), Japanese court lady (d. 1337)
 Siemowit of Bytom, Polish nobleman and knight (d. 1342)

Deaths 
 February 6 – William VII, Italian nobleman and knight (b. 1240)
 February 10 – Maurice VI de Craon, French nobleman (b. 1255)
 February 28 – Hugh de Courtenay, English nobleman (b. 1251) 
 April 4 – Nicholas IV, Italian pope of the Catholic Church (b. 1227)
 April 16 – Thibaud Gaudin, French nobleman and Grand Master
 May 2 – Conrad II, German nobleman (House of Teck) (b. 1235)
 May 8 – Amato Ronconi, Italian monk, hermit and saint (b. 1226)
 June 2 – Rhys ap Maredudd, Welsh nobleman and prince (b. 1250)
 July 24 – Kinga of Poland, Hungarian princess and abbess (b. 1224)
 September 25 – Alice of Saluzzo, Savoyan noblewoman and co-ruler
 September 30 – William I, German nobleman and co-ruler (b. 1270)
 October 3 – Benvenuta Bojani, Italian nun, mystic and saint (b. 1254)
 October 14 – John of Flanders, Flemish nobleman and prince-bishop
 October 20 – Saionji Kisshi (or Ōmiya-in), empress of Japan (b. 1225)
 October 25 – Robert Burnell, English bishop and chancellor (b. 1239)
 November 4 – Euphrosyne of Opole, Polish noblewoman and regent
 December 8 – John Peckham, English archbishop and writer (b. 1230)
 Abraham Abulafia, Spanish scholar, philosopher and writer (b. 1240)
 As-Suwaydi, Syrian physician, pharmacologist and writer (b. 1204)
 Beatrice of Savoy, Savoyan noblewoman (House of Savoy) (b. 1250) 
 Bernard of Trilia, French monk, theologian and philosopher (b. 1240)
 Darmabala (Protector of the Law), Mongolian nobleman (b. 1264)
 Gertrude of Hackeborn, German noblewoman and abbess (b. 1232)
 Guiraut Riquier de Narbona, French troubadour and writer (b. 1230)
 Ingeborg of Sweden, Swedish princess (House of Bjelbo) (b. 1263)
 Marjorie (or Margaret), Scottish noblewoman (suo jure) (b. 1256)
 Roger Bacon, English monk, philosopher and scientist (b. 1220)

References